WITG may refer to:

 Lasikin Airport (ICAO code WITG)
 WITG-LP, a low-power radio station (104.7 FM) licensed to Ocala, Florida, United States